was a feudal domain under the Tokugawa shogunate of Edo period Japan. The domain was centered at Kōfu Castle what is now the city of Kōfu, Yamanashi.

History
Kai Province was initially entrusted to important Tokugawa clan members as Kōfu Domain, and later to the highly placed fudai daimyō Yanagisawa clan, with periods of direct shogunal rule ( tenryō ) in between. Following the transfer of Yanagisawa Yoshisato to Yamato Province in 1724, the domain remained under direct shogunal control until the Meiji Restoration.

With the abolition of the han system in July 1871, Kōfu Domain became “Kōfu Prefecture”, which subsequently was renamed Yamanashi Prefecture.

List of daimyō 
{| class=wikitable
! #||Name || Tenure || Courtesy title || Court Rank || kokudaka||Notes
|-
|colspan=6|  Tokugawa clan, 1603-1704 (shinpan) 
|-
||1||||1603–1607||Uhōe-no-kami (右兵衛督)|| Lower 4th (従四位下) || 250,000 koku||9th son of Tokugawa Ieyasu
|-
||2||||1618–1624|| Gon-Chūnagon (権中納言)||Third (従三位)|| 238,000 koku||3rd son of Tokugawa Hidetada
|-
||3||||1661–1678||Sangi (参議)  || 3rd (従三位) || 250,000->350,000 koku||3rd son of Tokugawa Iemitsu
|-
||4||||1678–1704|| Gon-Chūnagon (権中納言)|| 3rd (従三位) || 350,000 koku||1st son of Tokugawa Tsunashigebecame 6th Shōgun, Tokugawa Ienobu
|-
|colspan=6|  Yanagisawa clan, 1704-1724 (fudai)
|-
||1||||1704–1709|| Mino-no-kami (美濃守); Sakonoe-shoshō (左権少将)|| Lower 4th (従四位下) || 150,000 koku||transfer from Kawagoe Domain
|-
||2||||1709–1724||Kai-no-kami(甲斐守)Jijū (侍従)|| 3rd (従三位)||150,000 koku||Eldest son of Yanagisawa Yoshiyasutransferred to Yamato-Kōriyama Domain
|-
|colspan=6|   Tokugawa clan, 1724-1871(tenryō) ||
|-
|}

See also 
 List of Han

References

External links
 "Kōfu" at Edo 300

Notes

Domains of Japan
History of Yamanashi Prefecture
1603 establishments in Japan
States and territories established in 1603
1724 disestablishments in Japan
States and territories disestablished in 1724
Kai Province